Kaspar Simeonov (born May 17, 1955) is a Bulgarian former volleyball player who competed in the 1980 Summer Olympics.

He was born in Dimitrovgrad.

He played for Lokomotiv Plovdiv volleyball club from 1974 to 1984. In 1980 he was part of the Bulgarian team which won the silver medal in the Olympic tournament. He played three matches. He played in Italy from 1984 to 1988. He is the father of volleyball player Venceslav Simeonov.

External links
profile

1955 births
Living people
Bulgarian men's volleyball players
Olympic volleyball players of Bulgaria
Volleyball players at the 1980 Summer Olympics
Olympic silver medalists for Bulgaria
Olympic medalists in volleyball
People from Dimitrovgrad, Bulgaria
Medalists at the 1980 Summer Olympics
Sportspeople from Haskovo Province
Bulgarian expatriate sportspeople in Italy
Expatriate volleyball players in Italy
Bulgarian volleyball coaches